Gyöngyi, Gyöngyvér, or Gyöngyvirág are Hungarian feminine given names.

They come from the Hungarian word, gyöngy, which means pearl. Gyöngyvirág means "lily of the valley" and Gyöngyvér was created from "gyöngy" and "testvér" (meaning "sister"), whereas Gyöngyi is a short form of either, or a nickname.

People with the given name Gyöngyi 

 Gyöngyi Salla, singer, musician, performing artist also known as Ziaflow
 Gyöngyi Szalay-Horváth (1968–2017), Hungarian fencer

Hungarian feminine given names